KHLY (1440 AM) is a radio station licensed to serve the community of Hailey, Idaho. The station is currently owned by Scott Parker, through licensee Sun Valley Media Group, LLC.

History
The call sign “KHLY” was first assigned to the World War II Liberty Ship SS PIERRE L’ENFANT, O.N. 243687 by the United States Coast Guard (USCG) built in 1943. The ship was sold in 1946 to commercial interests and after several owners, eventually grounded on the Black Sea near Tuapse and declared a total loss in 1970. 

Almost 50 years later and upon the request of Sun Valley Media Group LLC to use these call letters for a new commercial AM radio station at Hailey, Idaho, the U.S. Department of Homeland Security and the USCG released this call sign on September 5, 2019. Following that action, the Federal Communications Commission (FCC) then assigned KHLY for a new AM radio station in Hailey, Idaho.

The AM frequency was first licensed as KBET, on January 25, 2002 at Pocatello, Idaho, and renewed on December 1, 2005. In 2009, the Fifth District Court in Washington County, Utah appointed a receiver to take over the station for US Capital, of Boulder, Colorado - who foreclosed on Legacy Media, then owner of the station, along with several other stations. In 2013, the receiver sold the station in a District Court-approved sale to Main Street Broadcasting. In 2014, the station was sold to Freedom's Voice Broadcasting Corporation. And subsequent to that and effective, March 27, 2017, the station sold to current owner Scott Parker's Sun Valley Media Group, LLC.

After that transaction, Parker moved the station from Bannock County to Blaine County, Idaho. The station's call sign of KPTO was changed to KHLY to represent its new city of license of Hailey, where the company built another radio tower. Parker also signed-on FM translator station K279DA (also known as KSUN) atop Bald Mountain in Sun Valley, which re-broadcasts the station on the frequency of 103.7 MHz.

References

External links

Notice of Suspension of Operations/Request for Silent STA

HLY
Radio stations established in 2005
2005 establishments in Idaho